Falco Accame (17 April 1925 – 13 December 2021) was an Italian politician. A member of the Italian Socialist Party, he served in the Chamber of Deputies from 5 July 1976 to 11 July 1983.

References

1925 births
2021 deaths
20th-century Italian politicians
Italian Socialist Party politicians
Deputies of Legislature VII of Italy
Deputies of Legislature VIII of Italy
Politicians from Florence